Agelia is a genus of beetles in the family Buprestidae, containing the following species:

 Agelia burmensis Gussmann, 2002
 Agelia chalybea (Wiedemann, 1823)
 Agelia fasciata (Gory, 1840)
 Agelia limbata (Wiedemann, 1823)
 Agelia lordi (Walker, 1871)
 Agelia obtusicollis Fairmaire, 1884
 Agelia pectinicornis (Laporte & Gory, 1835)
 Agelia petelii (Gory, 1840)
 Agelia theryi Hoscheck, 1925

References

Buprestidae genera